Bryson Albright (March 15, 1994 – October 27, 2019) was an American football linebacker. He played college football at Miami (OH). He was signed by the Buffalo Bills as an undrafted free agent after the 2016 NFL Draft.

High school career
Albright attended St. Xavier High School in Cincinnati, Ohio. As a senior, he recorded 70 tackles and 11 sacks. He was then invited to play in Ohio's 2012 North-South All-Star game. ScoutingOhio.com ranked him in their top 150 recruits.

College career
Albright then attended Miami University, where he majored in kinesiology.

As a true freshman in 2012, he appeared in all 12 games. He recorded 19 tackles, one sack and 1.5 tackles-for-loss. In 2013, as a sophomore, he started all 12 games. He recorded 55 tackles (24 solo.), five sacks, 11.5 tackles-for-loss and one pass deflected. As a junior in 2014, he started all 12 games. He recorded 55 tackles, six sacks, eight tackles-for-loss, one forced fumble, one fumble recovery and one pass deflected. For the season, he was named Miami's Defensive Lineman of the Year. In 2015, he appeared in all 12 games (11 starts). He recorded 51 tackles (30 solo.), seven sacks and one interception.

Career statistics

Professional career

Buffalo Bills
After going undrafted in the 2016 NFL Draft, Albright was signed by the Buffalo Bills on May 2, 2016. After initially making the Bills 53-man, regular season roster, he was cut on September 15 and re-signed to the Bills' practice squad two days later. On December 10, he was promoted to the Bills' active roster for their game against the Pittsburgh Steelers. He was waived on December 13, 2016, and re-signed back to the practice squad.

Cincinnati Bengals
On January 24, 2017, Albright signed a reserve/future contract with the Bengals. He was waived on September 2, 2017.

Arizona Cardinals
On September 4, 2017, Albright was signed to the Arizona Cardinals' practice squad. He was promoted to the active roster on October 30, 2017.

On August 2, 2018, Albright was waived/injured by the Cardinals and placed on injured reserve. He was released five days later with an injury settlement.

Personal life
Albright is the son of Dan and Denise Albright. His brother Alex Albright is a former linebacker for Boston College and the Dallas Cowboys of the National Football League (NFL).

References

External links
 Miami Redhawks bio
 Buffalo Bills bio

1994 births
2019 deaths
Players of American football from Cincinnati
St. Xavier High School (Ohio) alumni
American football linebackers
American football defensive ends
Miami RedHawks football players
Buffalo Bills players
Cincinnati Bengals players
Arizona Cardinals players